This is a timeline documenting events of jazz in the year 2022.

Events

January

February

March

April
 April 29 - After being cancelled in 2020 and 2021 due to COVID-19, JazzFest reopens
 April 29 - Domi and JD Beck sign a contract with Anderson .Paak's label APESHIT in partnership with Blue Note Records and release their debut single SMILE
 April 30 - International Jazz Day occurs with a concert at the United Nations directed by Herbie Hancock

May
May 26 - Subgenre MUMBLE JAZZ is invented with Unc D’s single  HPHCPH.MMBL. MUMBLE JAZZ mixes jazz scatting with autotune modern hip hop flow.

June

July
 July 26 - Geri Allen is inducted into the DownBeat hall of fame
 July 29 - July 31 - The 2022 Blue Note Jazz Festival occurs hosted by Dave Chappelle. Artists such as Robert Glasper, DOMi and JD Beck, Dave Brubeck, Chris Botti, McCoy Tyner, Stanley Clarke, etc. are present.

August
 Jon Batiste wins top Jazz Artist in the 70th Annual DownBeat critics poll, Charles Lloyd & The Marvels wins top Jazz group

September
The 65th Monterey Jazz Festival Occurs

October
 October 1 to November 12 - Snarky Puppy set to go on tour in Europe to support their September 30th Album Empire Central
 October 6 to November 12 - French Kiwi Juice set to go on a North American tour
 October 20 - Fergus McCreadie wins the Scottish Album of the Year Award for his album Forest Floor

November

December

Albums

January

February

March

April

May

June

July

August

September

October

November

Deaths
January 13 – Fred Van Hove, 84, Belgian jazz musician
February 21 – Ernie Andrews, Jazz and R&B singer
June 3 – Grachan Moncur III, 85, American jazz musician
June 14 – Meghan Stabile, 39, American jazz producer/marketer
July 9 – Barbara Thompson, 77, British jazz saxophonist, flautist and composer
July 19 – Michael Henderson, 71, American jazz fusion bassist
July 25 – Milenko Stefanović, 92, Serbian classical and jazz clarinetist
August 9 – Della Griffin, 100, American jazz vocalist and drummer
August 10 – Abdul Wadud, 75, American jazz cellist
August 18 – Rolf Kühn, 92, German jazz clarinetist and saxophonist
August 22 – Fredy Studer, 74, Swiss percussionist
August 22 – Jaimie Branch, 39, American jazz trumpeter
August 25 - Joey DeFrancesco, 51, Jazz Organist and Multi Instrumentalist 
September 24 - Pharoah Sanders, 81, Tenor Saxophonist

See also

 List of 2022 albums
 List of jazz festivals
 List of years in jazz
 2022 in music

References

External links 

2020s in jazz
Jazz
Jazz